The following elections occurred in the year 1866.

 1866 Chilean presidential election
 1866 New Zealand general election

North America

Canada
 1866 New Brunswick general election

United States
 United States House of Representatives elections in California, 1866
 1866 New Orleans mayoral election
 1866 New York state election
 1866 and 1867 United States House of Representatives elections
 1866 and 1867 United States Senate elections

See also
 :Category:1866 elections

1866
Elections